David Joshua Tannor (born 1958) is a theoretical chemist, who is the Hermann Mayer Professorial Chair in the Department of Chemical Physics at the Weizmann Institute of Science.

Biography
Tannor has a BA from Columbia University (1978), and a PhD with Eric Heller from UCLA (1983). He did his post-doc work with Stuart Rice and David W. Oxtoby at the University of Chicago. He  is a black belt in karate. 

Tannor is a theoretical chemist. He studies the effects of quantum mechanics on how molecules move. He worked from 1986 to 1989 as an assistant professor at the Illinois Institute of Technology in Chicago, from 1989 to 1995 as an assistant and associate professor at the University of Notre Dame in South Bend, Indiana, from 1992 to 1993 as a visiting professor at Columbia University, and from 1995 to 2000 as an Associate Professor and since 2000 as a Professor at the Weizmann Institute of Science in Rehovot, Israel.

He is the Hermann Mayer Professorial Chair in the Department of Chemical Physics at the 
Weizmann Institute of Science.

Tannor is the author of Introduction to Quantum Mechanics (2018). He has also published or co-published over 120 scientific articles and reviews.

References

External links
David Tannor (November 25, 2013). "Control of Multielectron Dynamics and High Harmonic Generation" (video).
David Tannor (January 26, 2016). "Quantum Transitions using Complex-Valued Classical Trajectories" (video).

Israeli male karateka
Illinois Institute of Technology faculty
Living people
Columbia College (New York) alumni
University of California, Los Angeles alumni
American physical chemists
Israeli physical chemists
Theoretical chemists
University of Notre Dame faculty
Academic staff of Weizmann Institute of Science
Columbia University faculty
1958 births
20th-century American chemists
21st-century American chemists
Quantum physicists